Galle (formerly Point de Galle) is a major city in Sri Lanka, situated on the southwestern tip,  from Colombo. Galle is the provincial capital and largest city of Southern Province, Sri Lanka and is the capital of Galle District.

Galle was known as Gimhathiththa before the arrival of the Portuguese in the 16th century, when it was the main port on the island. Ibn Batuta, a Moroccan Berber Muslim traveller in the 14th century, referred to it as Qali. Galle reached the height of its development in the 18th century, during the Dutch colonial period. Galle is the best example of a fortified city built by the Portuguese in South and Southeast Asia, showing the interaction between Portuguese architectural styles and native traditions. The city was extensively fortified by the Dutch during the 17th century from 1649 onwards. The Galle fort is a world heritage site and is the largest remaining fortress in Asia built by European occupiers.

Other prominent landmarks in Galle include the city's natural harbour, the National Maritime Museum, St. Mary's Cathedral founded by Jesuit priests, one of the main Shiva temples on the island, and Amangalla, the historic luxury hotel. On 26 December 2004, the city was devastated by the massive tsunami caused by the 2004 Indian Ocean earthquake, which occurred off the coast of Indonesia a thousand miles away. Thousands were killed in the city alone. Galle is home to the Galle International Stadium, which is considered to be one of the most picturesque cricket grounds in the world. The ground, which was severely damaged by the tsunami, was rebuilt and test matches resumed there on 18 December 2007.

Important natural geographical features in Galle include Rumassala in Unawatuna, a large mound-like hill that forms the eastern protective barrier to Galle Harbour. Local tradition associates this hill with some events of Ramayana, one of the great Hindu epics. The major river in the area is the Gin Ganga, which begins from Gongala Kanda, passes villages such as Neluwa, Nagoda, Baddegama, Thelikada and Wakwella, and reaches the sea at Gintota. The river is bridged at Wakwella by the Wakwella Bridge.

Etymology
Galle was known as Gimhathitha in ancient times. The term is believed to be derived from the classical Sinhalese term meaning "port near the River Gin". It is believed that the town got its name as Gaalla in the native tongue as a result of the large number of bullock carts that took shelter in the area, following the long slow journeys from remote areas of the island. Gaala in Sinhala means the place where cattle are herded together; hence the Sinhalese name for Galle, ගාල්ල, is a development from Gaala. Another theory is that the word Galle is derived from the Latin word gallus, which means 'rooster'. The Dutch used the rooster as a symbol of Galle, though probably the word comes from the Portuguese galo (rooster).

History 
According to James Emerson Tennent, Galle was the ancient seaport of Tarshish, from which King Solomon drew ivory, peacocks and other valuables. Cinnamon was exported from Sri Lanka as early as 1400 BC, and as the root of the word itself is Hebrew, Galle may have been a main entrepôt for the spice.

Ancient Greek and Roman geographers may have known about Galle, which they might have called the Cape of Birds. Ptolemy might also have known about the port which he referred to as Odoka. Moroccan traveller Ibn Battuta visited Galle (or Qali as he called it) in 1342. During the 12th and 13th centuries, Sinhalese refugees fleeing Tamil armies from the north began to settle in Galle and other nearby areas.

Galle had been a prominent seaport long before western rule in the country: Persians, Arabs, Greeks, Romans, Malays, Indians, and Chinese were doing business through Galle's port. In 1411, the Galle Trilingual Inscription, a stone tablet inscription in three languages, Chinese, Tamil and Persian, was erected in Galle to commemorate the second visit to Ceylon by the Chinese admiral Zheng He. In 1502, a small fleet of Portuguese ships, under the command of Lourenço de Almeida on their way to the Maldives, were blown off course by a storm. Realising that the King resided in Kotte close to Colombo, Lourenço proceeded there after a brief stop in Galle.

In 1640, the Portuguese were forced to surrender to the Dutch East India Company. The Dutch built the present fort in 1663. They built a fortified solid granite wall and three bastions, known as "Sun", "Moon" and "Star".

After the British took over the country from the Dutch in 1796, they preserved the fort unchanged and used it as the administrative centre of the district.

Climate
Galle features a tropical rainforest climate. The city has no true dry season, though it is noticeably drier in the months of January and February. As is commonplace with many cities with this type of climate, temperatures show little variation throughout the course of the year, with average temperatures hovering at around  throughout.

Cityscape

Wards
Galle has twenty wards:

 Gintota
 Dadalla
 Bope
 Kumbalwella
 Madawalamulla
 Deddugoda
 Maitipe
 Dangedara
 Bataganvila
 Sangamiththapura
 Galwadugoda
 Kandewaththa
 Kaluwella
 Galle Town
 Weliwaththa
 Thalapitiya
 Makuluwa
 Milidduwa
 Magalle
 Katugoda
Imaduwa

Governance
The Galle Municipal Council governs the City of Galle, established under the Municipalities Ordinance of 1865. It was at the time, only the third municipal council in the country. The first mayor of the city, Wijeyananda Dahanayake, was appointed in 1939; he later became the fifth Prime Minister of Ceylon.

The last appointed mayor was Methsiri De Silva, who served from 2009 to 2016. The mayoral system has been dissolved the Galle administration, with the city presently administered by a commissioner. The main vision of the city is "Building of moderate city through the supply of relatively increased utility services to the citizens who pay taxes to the Galle Municipal Council". The other vision is to brand Galle as "Green City-Green Galle" to create and promote Galle as one of Sri Lanka's cool and healthy coastal cities with a clean green canopy.

Demographics
Galle is a sizeable city by Sri Lankan standards, and has a population of 101,749, the majority of whom are of Sinhalese ethnicity, with a large population of Sri Lankan Moor (Muslims), particularly in the fort area, who descend from Arab merchants that settled in the ancient port of Galle and married Sinhalese and Sri Lankan Tamil women. Galle is also notable for its foreign population, both residents and owners of holiday homes.
Government Statistics.lk

Education

Schools

Galle is home to some of the oldest leading schools in Sri Lanka, with twenty-nine government schools and five international schools constituting the city's educational system. Some of the schools located in Galle city are listed below.

Universities 

Three main faculties of the University of Ruhuna are located in Galle. The Faculty of Engineering is located at Hapugala, about 6 km from the city center. The Faculty of Medicine is located at Karapitiya near the Karapitiya Teaching Hospital. The Faculty of Allied Health Sciences of the University of Ruhuna is located in Uluwitike, in the city limits. A study centre of the Open University of Sri Lanka is also located in Galle, at Labuduwa junction.
 Faculty of Engineering, University of Ruhuna
 Faculty of Medicine, University of Ruhuna
 Faculty of Allied Health Sciences, University of Ruhuna
 Study Centre, Open University of Sri Lanka

Higher education institutes

The Advanced Technological Institute in Labuduwa, Galle was started in 2000, and it planned to offer Higher National Diploma in Information Technology and Higher National Diploma in Agriculture Technology – HNDT (Agri). Since then, Labuduwa ATI has been a pioneer in technological education in Sri Lanka. The National Institute of Business Management in Galle was established in 2010 to provide higher education opportunities in the fields of information technology and business management. The Ruhunu National College of Education, operated under the auspices of the Ministry of Education, trains teachers training for government schools in Kurunduwatta, Galle. Additionally, the Amarasuriya Teachers' Training College for government school teachers is in Unawatuna, Galle.
 Advanced Technological Institute (ATI)
 National Institute of Business Management (NIBM)
 Ruhunu National College of Education
 Amarasuriya Teachers' Training College
 Merchantile Seaman Training Institute (MSTI)

Transport

Galle is served by Sri Lanka Railways' Coastal Line and is connected by rail to Colombo and Matara. Galle Railway Station is a major station on the line and serves as the meeting point of the west- and south-coast segments of the line. The A2 highway, which is commonly known as the Galle Road, runs through the city and connects Galle to Colombo by the west-coast portion, and to Hambanthota by the south-coast portion.
The Southern Expressway, Sri Lanka's first E Class highway, links the Sri Lankan capital Colombo with Galle and currently reduces the time spent for travel to one hour from the three hours taken by the regular A2 highway.

Twin towns – sister cities
Galle is twinned with:
 Velsen, Netherlands

Notable people
see :Category:People from Galle

See also 
 Galle Fort
 Galle International Stadium
 Hikkaduwa
 Pilana Raja Maha Vihara
 Unawatuna

References

External links 
 Galle Municipal Council

 
 Old Town of Galle and its Fortifications, UNESCO World Heritage
 Official website of the Sri Lanka Tourism Board

 
Provincial capitals in Sri Lanka
Populated coastal places in Sri Lanka